Pickled onions are a food item consisting of onions (cultivars of Allium cepa) pickled in a solution of vinegar and salt, often with other preservatives and flavourings. There is a variety of small white pickled onions known as 'silverskin' onions; due to imperfections they are pickled instead of being wasted. They are frequently used as an essential component of the Martini cocktail variant known as a Gibson.

Silverskin onions are pickled in white vinegar, and are much smaller. Full sized onions, e.g., Spanish onions, can be pickled if sliced first.

By country
In the United Kingdom, the onions are traditionally eaten alongside fish and chips and with a ploughman's lunch.

In the Southern United States, pickled Vidalia onions can be served as a side dish.

In Hong Kong, pickled onions are served in many Cantonese restaurants, especially around dinner time, as a small dish before the main course is served.

In Switzerland, they are served to accompany raclette, along with pickled gherkins.

In Italy, it is known as 'maggiolina'.

In Mexican cuisine, one preparation, cebollas encurtidas, has sliced red onions pickled in a mixture of citrus juices and vinegar, which is served as a garnish or condiment. Sometimes cooked beets are added, producing a more strongly pink coloured dish. Pickled red onions in bitter orange juice are especially emblematic of Yucatán cuisine, where they are used as a garnish or condiment, especially for seafood.

See also

 List of pickled foods

References

Onion-based foods
Onion
English cuisine
Dutch cuisine
Swiss cuisine
Italian cuisine
American cuisine
Mexican cuisine
Hong Kong cuisine